Loveridge's frog (Philoria loveridgei), also known as the masked mountain frog, is a species of frogs in the family Limnodynastidae.

It is endemic to Australia.

Its natural habitats are subtropical and tropical moist lowland forests, subtropical and tropical moist montane forests, and streams.

It is threatened by habitat loss and by infection of the amphibian chytrid fungus. Loveridge's frog is named in honour of British herpetologist, Arthur Loveridge.

Sources

Philoria
Amphibians of Queensland
Amphibians of New South Wales
Amphibians described in 1940
Taxonomy articles created by Polbot
Frogs of Australia